Biskau (also Romanized as Bīskāū; also known as Bīskāh, Bīskan, and Bīskū) is a village in Sardasht Rural District, in the Central District of Bashagard County, Hormozgan Province, Iran. At the 2006 census, its population was 115, in 28 families.

References 

Populated places in Bashagard County